Langworth is a small unincorporated community in Stanislaus County, California, United States and is 3 miles west of Oakdale, California.

History
Langworth is located on part of the 8 square league Rancho Thompson granted by Mexican Governor Pío Pico to Alpheus Basil Thompson in 1846. Originally the site that became Langworth was the location of Islips Ferry, westernmost crossing of the Stanislaus River, on the route of the Stockton - Los Angeles Road. 
  
Founded in 1860 by Henry Langworthy, Langworth was a thriving town with its own post office from 1864 to 1871. 
The coming of the railroad crossing up river and the resulting establishment of Oakdale on the rail line, contributed to the town's decline, its post office closed and was moved to Oakdale in 1871.  Today, only farms still stand reminding the town of its rich agricultural past.

Unincorporated communities in California
Unincorporated communities in Stanislaus County, California